Lucia Lucas (born July 3, 1980) is an American transgender baritone. She made history when, in March, 2018, it was announced that she would become the first transgender person to perform a principal role on an American operatic stage.

Biography 
Lucas grew up in Sacramento, California. She studied horn and voice at California State University, Sacramento and then did graduate work at the Chicago College of Performing Arts. She moved to Germany in 2009. She decided to transition in November 2013, started taking estrogen and antiandrogens in July 2014 and underwent facial feminization surgery in September. In 2016, she had her gender reassignment surgery.

The performance on May 3, 2019, in Tulsa, Oklahoma, saw Lucas playing the starring role in Mozart's Don Giovanni with the Tulsa Opera. The performance is the subject of the 2020 feature documentary The Sound of Identity, directed by James Kicklighter. Subsequently, Lucas became the first transgender baritone to appear with the English National Opera in London on 5 October 2019, playing Public Opinion in Orpheus in the Underworld at the London Coliseum.

Lucas will play Lili Elbe in the world premiere of Tobias Picker’s new opera, Lili Elbe.

Personal life 
Lucia Lucas married Ariana Lucas in 2009.

References

Year of birth missing (living people)
Living people
American operatic baritones
Musicians from Sacramento, California
Transgender women
American LGBT singers
21st-century American women opera singers
Classical musicians from California
Singers from California
LGBT classical musicians
1980 births